The Asian Connection is a 2016 action film starring Steven Seagal.

Premise
Two expatriates living in Thailand go to Cambodia and steal a drug lord's money.

Production
The film was based on a story by the actor Tom Sizemore called The Mexican Connection. It was rewritten to be set in Asia.

Reception
The Los Angeles Times called the film  "a dumb, boring dud", even by B-movie standards and accounting for the name Steven Seagal above the title.
Jason Best of Movie Talk gave it 1 out of 5, calling it "An amateurish effort all round."

Home media
In home video sales the film earned an estimated $45,567.

References

External links
 
 

2016 films
American action films
2016 action films
2010s English-language films
Films directed by Daniel Zirilli
2010s American films